A system of plant taxonomy, the Goldberg system was published in: 

Aaron Goldberg treats the Angiosperms, in which he recognizes 334 families and 59 orders of dicotyledons and accept 57 families and 18 orders of monocotyledons:


Dicotyledoneae

Classis Dicotyledoneae
Ordo Trochodendrales
 Tetracentraceae
 Trochodendraceae
 Eupteleaceae
 Cercidiphyllaceae
Ordo Hamamelidales
 Platanaceae
 Hamamelidaceae
 Buxaceae
 Myrothamnaceae
 Daphniphyllaceae
 Didymelaceae
Ordo Magnoliales
 Magnoliaceae
 Degeneriaceae
 Himantandraceae
 Winteraceae
 Annonaceae
 Eupomatiaceae
 Myristicaceae
 Canellaceae
 Schisandraceae
 Illiciaceae
 Austrobaileyaceae
 Trimeniaceae
 Amborellaceae
 Monimiaceae
 Calycanthaceae
 Idiospermaceae
Ordo Laurales
 Gomortegaceae
 Lauraceae
 Hernandiaceae
Ordo Aristolochiales
 Aristolochiaceae
Ordo Ranunculales
 Ranunculaceae
 Berberidaceae
 Sargentodoxaceae
 Lardizabalaceae
 Menispermaceae
 Nandinaceae
 Podophyllaceae
 Paeoniaceae
 Circaeasteraceae
Ordo Haloragales
 Haloragaceae
 Gunneraceae
 Hippuridaceae
 Callitrichaceae
Ordo Sarraceniales
 Sarraceniaceae
Ordo Nepenthales
 Nepenthaceae
Ordo Piperales
 Saururaceae
 Piperaceae
 Chloranthaceae
 Lactoridaceae
Ordo Nymphaeales
 Nymphaeaceae
 Ceratophyllaceae
 Cabombaceae
 Nelumbonaceae
Ordo Proteales
 Proteaceae
Ordo Balanopales
 Balanopaceae
Ordo Fagales
 Betulaceae
 Fagaceae
 Simmondsiaceae
 Leitneriaceae
 Myricaceae
 Juglandaceae
 Rhoipteleaceae
Ordo Salicales
 Salicaceae
Ordo Casuarinales
 Casuarinaceae
Ordo Urticales
 Ulmaceae
 Moraceae
 Urticaceae
 Eucommiaceae
 Barbeyaceae
 Cannabaceae
Ordo Fabales
 Fabaceae
 Mimosaceae
 Caesalpiniaceae
Ordo Papaverales
 Papaveraceae
 Fumariaceae
 Capparaceae
 Brassicaceae
 Tovariaceae
 Resedaceae
 Moringaceae
 Pentadiplandraceae
 Bretschneideraceae
Ordo Batales
 Bataceae
Ordo Dilleniales
 Dilleniaceae
 Actinidiaceae
 Saurauiaceae
Ordo Theales
 Theaceae
 Pentaphylacaceae
 Bonnetiaceae
 Pellicieraceae
 Medusagynaceae
 Eucryphiaceae
 Paracryphiaceae
 Symplocaceae
 Clusiaceae
 Tetrameristaceae
 Quiinaceae
 Hypericaceae
 Elatinaceae
 Dipterocarpaceae
 Ancistrocladaceae
 Caryocaraceae
 Marcgraviaceae
 Ochnaceae
 Strasburgeriaceae
 Diegodendraceae
 Sphaerosepalaceae
 Scytopetalaceae
 Sarcolaenaceae
Ordo Ebenales
 Sapotaceae
 Ebenaceae
Ordo Styracales
 Styracaceae
 Lissocarpaceae
 Alangiaceae
Ordo Violales
 Flacourtiaceae
 Lacistemataceae
 Malesherbiaceae
 Passifloraceae
 Turneraceae
 Achariaceae
 Caricaceae
 Violaceae
 Stachyuraceae
 Scyphostegiaceae
 Peridiscaceae
 Hoplestigmataceae
 Loasaceae
 Cucurbitaceae
Ordo Cistales
 Cistaceae
 Bixaceae
 Cochlospermaceae
Ordo Ericales
 Clethraceae
 Pyrolaceae
 Ericaceae
 Empetraceae
 Monotropaceae
 Epacridaceae
 Diapensiaceae
 Cyrillaceae
 Lennoaceae
Ordo Rafflesiales
 Rafflesiaceae
 Hydnoraceae
Ordo Balanophorales
 Balanophoraceae
Ordo Celastrales
 Ctenolophonaceae
 Ixonanthaceae
 Irvingiaceae
 Dichapetalaceae
 Celastraceae
 Goupiaceae
 Siphonodontaceae
Ordo Rhamnales
 Rhamnaceae
 Vitaceae
 Leeaceae
 Erythropalaceae
 Aquifoliaceae
 Icacinaceae
Ordo Caryophyllales
 Cactaceae
 Aizoaceae
 Portulacaceae
 Theligonaceae
 Didiereaceae
 Gyrostemonaceae
 Phytolaccaceae
 Barbeuiaceae
 Achatocarpaceae
 Petiveriaceae
 Agdestidaceae
 Nyctaginaceae
 Stegnospermaceae
 Caryophyllaceae
 Molluginaceae
 Illecebraceae
 Basellaceae
 Chenopodiaceae
 Amaranthaceae
Ordo Primulales
 Theophrastaceae
 Myrsinaceae
 Primulaceae
 Plumbaginaceae
 Tamaricaceae
 Frankeniaceae
Ordo Polygonales
 Polygonaceae
Ordo Plantaginales
 Plantaginaceae
Ordo Euphorbiales
 Euphorbiaceae
 Aextoxicaceae
 Pandaceae
Ordo Malvales
 Elaeocarpaceae
 Tiliaceae
 Malvaceae
 Bombacaceae
 Sterculiaceae
Ordo Rosales
 Rosaceae
 Corynocarpaceae
 Crossosomataceae
 Neuradaceae
 Coriariaceae
Ordo Myrtales
 Myrtaceae
 Lecythidaceae
 Barringtoniaceae
 Asteranthaceae
 Dialypetalanthaceae
 Sonneratiaceae
 Punicaceae
 Rhizophoraceae
 Lythraceae
 Crypteroniaceae
 Oliniaceae
 Melastomataceae
 Trapaceae
 Combretaceae
 Onagraceae
 Penaeaceae
Ordo Saxifragales
 Saxifragaceae
 Crassulaceae
 Parnassiaceae
 Eremosynaceae
 Francoaceae
 Davidsoniaceae
 Hydrangeaceae
 Philadelphaceae
 Pterostemonaceae
 Iteaceae
 Baueraceae
 Bruniaceae
 Vahliaceae
 Donatiaceae
 Tetracarpaeaceae
 Escalloniaceae
 Grossulariaceae
 Brunelliaceae
 Cunoniaceae
 Greyiaceae
 Cephalotaceae
Ordo Droserales
 Dioncophyllaceae
 Droseraceae
 Byblidaceae
 Podostemaceae
 Hydrostachyaceae
Ordo Begoniales
 Datiscaceae
 Begoniaceae
Ordo Apiales
 Araliaceae
 Apiaceae
Ordo Cornales
 Nyssaceae
 Davidiaceae
 Cornaceae
 Garryaceae
Ordo Dipsacales
 Caprifoliaceae
 Adoxaceae
 Valerianaceae
 Dipsacaceae
Ordo Rutales
 Rutaceae
 Cneoraceae
 Simaroubaceae
 Burseraceae
 Meliaceae
 Anacardiaceae
Ordo Sapindales
 Akaniaceae
 Aceraceae
 Sapindaceae
 Hippocastanaceae
 Staphyleaceae
 Sabiaceae
 Melianthaceae
Ordo Geraniales
 Geraniaceae
 Vivianiaceae
 Limnanthaceae
 Oxalidaceae
 Tropaeolaceae
 Connaraceae
 Balsaminaceae
 Stackhousiaceae
 Zygophyllaceae
 Linaceae
 Erythroxylaceae
 Balanitaceae
 Malpighiaceae
Ordo Polygalales
 Polygalaceae
 Krameriaceae
 Trigoniaceae
 Vochysiaceae
Ordo Oleales
 Oleaceae
 Salvadoraceae
Ordo Gentianales
 Loganiaceae
 Plocospermataceae
 Apocynaceae
 Asclepiadaceae
 Convolvulaceae
 Cuscutaceae
 Rubiaceae
 Columelliaceae
 Gentianaceae
 Menyanthaceae
Ordo Santalales
 Olacaceae
 Aptandraceae
 Octoknemaceae
 Opiliaceae
 Medusandraceae
 Cardiopteridaceae
 Santalaceae
 Misodendraceae
 Loranthaceae
 Grubbiaceae
Ordo Thymelaeales
 Geissolomataceae
 Gonystylaceae
 Thymelaeaceae
Ordo Polemoniales
 Polemoniaceae
 Fouquieriaceae
 Hydrophyllaceae
 Boraginaceae
Ordo Scrophulariales
 Nolanaceae
 Solanaceae
 Scrophulariaceae
 Buddlejaceae
 Globulariaceae
 Lentibulariaceae
 Orobanchaceae
 Acanthaceae
 Bignoniaceae
 Gesneriaceae
 Pedaliaceae
Ordo Lamiales
 Myoporaceae
 Verbenaceae
 Phrymaceae
 Lamiaceae
Ordo Campanulales
 Campanulaceae
 Goodeniaceae
 Brunoniaceae
 Calyceraceae
 Stylidiaceae
Ordo Asterales
 Asteraceae
 Incertae sedis
 Tremandraceae
 Elaeagnaceae
 Pittosporaceae

Monocotyledoneae

 Classis Monocotyledoneae
Ordo Pandanales
 Pandanaceae
Ordo Alismatales
 Alismataceae
 Butomaceae
 Hydrocharitaceae
Ordo Triuridales
 Triuridaceae
Ordo Juncaginales
 Scheuchzeriaceae
 Juncaginaceae
 Lilaeaceae
Ordo Najadales
 Aponogetonaceae
 Zosteraceae
 Potamogetonaceae
 Zannichelliaceae
 Najadaceae
 Posidoniaceae
Ordo Typhales
 Sparganiaceae
 Typhaceae
Ordo Juncales
 Juncaceae
 Thurniaceae
 Centrolepidaceae
 Restionaceae
 Flagellariaceae
Ordo Cyperales
 Cyperaceae
Ordo Poales
 Poaceae
Ordo Arecales
 Arecaceae
Ordo Cyclanthales
 Cyclanthaceae
Ordo Arales
 Araceae
 Lemnaceae
Ordo Liliales
 Trilliaceae
 Liliaceae
 Smilacaceae
 Agavaceae
 Xanthorrhoeaceae
 Philesiaceae
 Dioscoreaceae
 Taccaceae
 Pontederiaceae
 Amaryllidaceae
 Velloziaceae
Ordo Bromeliales
 Bromeliaceae
Ordo Commelinales
 Commelinaceae
 Mayacaceae
 Xyridaceae
 Rapateaceae
 Eriocaulaceae
Ordo Zingiberales
 Musaceae
 Strelitziaceae
 Lowiaceae
 Zingiberaceae
 Cannaceae
 Marantaceae
Ordo Iridales
 Haemodoraceae
 Philydraceae
 Iridaceae
 Burmanniaceae
Ordo Orchidales
 Corsiaceae
 Orchidaceae

system, Goldberg